Laurel Lake also known as Mud Lake is a small lake southwest of Arena in Delaware County, New York. It drains northwest via an unnamed creek that flows into the Pepacton Reservoir.

See also
 List of lakes in New York

References 

Lakes of New York (state)
Lakes of Delaware County, New York